Parareicheia is a genus of beetles in the family Carabidae, containing the following species:

 Parareicheia lencinai Ortuño & Magrini, 2006
 Parareicheia nevesi (Jeannel, 1957)
 Parareicheia zoiai (Sciaky, 1989)

References

Scaritinae